Walchelin was a Norman name (today Vauquelin or Gauquelin), which may refer to:
Walchelin de Ferriers, 12th-century lord of Oakham Castle
Walkelin de Derby, 12th-century lord of Egginton, Derbyshire
Walkelin, Bishop of Winchester

See also
Walkelin de Ferrers (disambiguation)
Vauquelin (disambiguation), surname